Vice-Admiral Charles James FitzGerald, 1st Baron Lecale PC (Ire) (30 June 1756 – 18 February 1810), styled Lord Charles FitzGerald between 1761 and 1800, was an Irish naval commander and politician.

Background
FitzGerald was the third son of James FitzGerald, 1st Duke of Leinster, and Lady Emily, daughter of Charles Lennox, 2nd Duke of Richmond and the second of the famous Lennox Sisters. He was the brother of William FitzGerald, 2nd Duke of Leinster, Lord Henry FitzGerald and Lord Edward FitzGerald. Through his mother he was a great-great-grandson of King Charles II. There were 19 children in his family. His sister Lady Charlotte FitzGerald took the title of Baroness Rayleigh in 1821. His brother Lord Edward FitzGerald is known as the famous Irish revolutionary. One of his numerous brothers was Lord Robert Stephen FitzGerald who is known to be a British diplomat in Switzerland 1792–1795.

Political and naval career
FitzGerald sat as a Member of Parliament (MP) in the Irish House of Commons for Kildare County from 1776 to 1790, for Cavan Borough from 1790 to 1798 and for Ardfert from 1798 to the Act of Union in 1801. He served as High Sheriff of Down in 1783, a Commissioner of Customs between 1789 and 1792 and as Muster-Master-General of Ireland between 1792 and 1806.

He also served in the Royal Navy. He was commissioned as a lieutenant in 1777, and his first command was the cutter  in 1779. He sailed her to Saint Lucia, where she was wrecked in March 1780, though without loss of life. He was made post-captain on 23 May 1780. Thereafter he was captain of a number of frigates. He participated in the Battle of the Chesapeake in 1781. He was made a Rear-Admiral in 1790.

On 27 December 1800, he was raised to the Peerage of Ireland as Baron Lecale, of Ardglass in the County of Down. He briefly represented Arundel in the British House of Commons between January and April 1807.

Family
Lord Lecale was twice married, the second time in London on 18 July 1808 to former Mrs. Julia Carton (died Courtlands, Devon, 6 May 1844), without issue. His only children, both illegitimate, were Henry FitzGerald, who died at sea, off Civitavecchia, on 14 September 1803, and Anna Maria FitzGerald who eventually married morganatically to the Hon. Algernon Percy (diplomat). 
Lecale converted 15th century warehouses in Ardglass, County Down into a castellated house, known as Ardglass Castle, at the end of the 18th century. The castle is now the home of Ardglass Golf Club.  He died in the Castle in February 1810, aged 53, when the barony became extinct.
Lord Lecale's tomb is located in Bright parish church, which bears a memorial plate in his name.

Notes

References

Lecale
Lecale
Lecale
Lecale
High Sheriffs of Down
Irish MPs 1776–1783
Irish MPs 1783–1790
Irish MPs 1790–1797
Irish MPs 1798–1800
Members of the Parliament of the United Kingdom for English constituencies
UK MPs 1806–1807
UK MPs who were granted peerages
Younger sons of dukes
Charles
Lecale
Lecale
Politicians from County Kildare
19th-century Irish people
Members of the Parliament of Ireland (pre-1801) for County Cavan constituencies
Members of the Parliament of Ireland (pre-1801) for County Kerry constituencies
Members of the Parliament of Ireland (pre-1801) for County Kildare constituencies